Tomáš Rohan (born January 1, 1989) is a Czech professional ice hockey forward for HC Baník Sokolov of the Chance Liga.

Rohan previously played 103 games with HC Karlovy Vary in the Czech Extraliga.

His younger brother Martin Rohan is also a professional ice hockey player.

References

External links

1989 births
Living people
HC Baník Sokolov players
Czech ice hockey forwards
Sportovní Klub Kadaň players
HC Karlovy Vary players
HC Most players
People from Kraslice
Sportspeople from the Karlovy Vary Region